The Run is the fifth novel in the Will Lee series by Stuart Woods. It was first published in 2000 by HarperCollins. The novel takes place in Washington, D. C. and different states, some time after the events of Grass Roots. The novel continues the story of the Lee family of Delano, Georgia.

It follows the campaign of Will Lee for the presidency as he faces past and present threats.

References

External links
Stuart Woods official site

2000 American novels
American thriller novels
HarperCollins books